HMAS Rankin is the sixth and final submarine of the Collins class, which are operated by the Royal Australian Navy (RAN). Named for Lieutenant Commander Robert William Rankin, the boat was laid down in 1995, and commissioned into the RAN in March 2003, following major delays.

Early in her career, Rankin was the subject of a documentary series and a coffee table book. She was the first submarine since 1987 to be awarded the Gloucester Cup.

Construction
Rankin was laid down by Australian Submarine Corporation on 12 May 1995. The boat was launched on 7 November 2001.

Rankin was named for Lieutenant Commander Robert William Rankin, who died when the ship he commanded, engaged a force of five Japanese warships on 4 March 1942, to allow an Allied convoy to escape. The boat is nicknamed "The Black Knight".

Characteristics

The Collins class is an enlarged version of the Västergötland-class submarine designed by Kockums. The hull is constructed from high-tensile micro-alloy steel, and are covered in a skin of anechoic tiles to minimise detection by sonar.

The submarine is armed with six  torpedo tubes, and carry a standard payload of 22 torpedoes: originally a mix of Gould Mark 48 Mod 4 torpedoes and UGM-84C Sub-Harpoon, with the Mark 48s later upgraded to the Mod 7 Common Broadband Advanced Sonar System (CBASS) version.

Each submarine is equipped with three Garden Island-Hedemora HV V18b/15Ub (VB210) 18-cylinder diesel engines, which are each connected to a 1,400 kW, 440-volt DC Jeumont-Schneider generator. The electricity generated is stored in batteries, then supplied to a single Jeumont-Schneider DC motor, which provides 7,200 shaft horsepower to a single, seven-bladed,  diameter skewback propeller. The Collins class has a speed of  when surfaced and at snorkel depth, and can reach  underwater. Each boat has a endurance of 70 days.

Operational history
During a multinational exercise in September 2003, which was attended by Rankin and sister boat Waller, Rankin successfully "sank" a Singaporean anti-submarine warfare vessel.

In 2004, a film crew was embarked aboard Rankin for the creation of Submariners, a six-part documentary aired by SBS in 2005 and depicting life aboard a submarine. The film crew was on board from February to April 2004, during which the boat completed pre-deployment trials, participated in the submarine rescue exercise Pacific Reach, and made a diplomatic visit to Kure, Japan. They later rejoined Rankin during the submarine's deployment to Hawaii for RIMPAC 04 in June and July. Later that year, Rankin was also the subject of the book Beneath Southern Seas. The coffee table book, which encompasses the history of the Royal Australian Navy Submarine Service, was primarily based on photographs and interviews of Rankin and those aboard taken by the authors during a twelve-day voyage from Sydney to Fremantle, concluding the six-month deployment started during the filming of Submariners. The  voyage—the longest undertaken by a Collins-class submarine to that date—began with workups in February, and saw the submarine visit Korea, Japan, and Hawaii, and participate in various multinational exercises before returning to Fremantle via Sydney. Rankin was at sea for 126 days, 80% of which was spent underwater.

On 10 June 2005, Rankin was presented with the Gloucester Cup. Presented to the RAN vessel with the greatest overall efficiency over the previous twelve months, Rankin was the first Collins-class submarine to earn the Cup, and the first submarine to receive it since  in 1987. The award was again presented to Rankin in 2008.

Rankin was docked for a long maintenance period in 2008, but workforce shortages and malfunctions on other submarines requiring urgent attention have drawn this out: in 2010 RAN and ASC officials predicted that she would not be back in service until 2013.

Citations

References
Books
 
 
 
 

Journal and news articles
 
 
 

 
 
 

Other media

External links

Royal Australian Navy webpage for HMAS Rankin (SSG 78)
Submariners Documentary site 

Collins-class submarines
Ships built in South Australia
2001 ships
Submarines of Australia
Military Units in Western Australia